Larenz Tate (born September 8, 1975) is an American film and television actor. He is best known for his roles as O-Dog in Menace II Society and as Councilman Rashad Tate in Power. Tate's other films and television series include the films Dead Presidents, Love Jones, A Man Apart, Crash, Waist Deep, Ray and the television series Rush and Game of Silence.

Early life 
Larenz Tate was born in Chicago, Illinois, to Peggy and Larry Tate. He is the youngest of three siblings; his two brothers, Larron and Lahmard, are also actors. The family moved to California during the early 1980s. Convinced by their parents to enter a drama program at the Inner City Cultural Center, the trio did not take the lessons seriously until classmate Malcolm-Jamal Warner's ascent to fame after being cast on the sitcom The Cosby Show. Subsequently, realizing that they could parlay their efforts into a tangible form of success, the siblings began to receive small roles and in 1985, Tate made his small-screen debut in an episode of The New Twilight Zone. Tate attended Palmdale High School, graduating in 1993.

Career 
Following appearances in such television series as 21 Jump Street and The Wonder Years, Tate was cast in the television movie The Women of Brewster Place before receiving the recurring role of Steve Urkel's nemesis, Willie Fuffner, in the sitcom Family Matters. He also appeared as Curtis, a grandson of Redd Foxx's character on the CBS series The Royal Family. Foxx died of a heart attack a month after The Royal Family debuted, and a reworking with Jackée Harry as part of the cast failed to save the series. 

After numerous acting roles on television, collaborative filmmaking siblings Albert and Allen Hughes approached him to star in their debut feature Menace II Society in late 1992. In the film, Tate portrayed "O-Dog", a trigger-happy teenager. Frederick I. Douglass of the Baltimore Afro-American opined Tate's performance in the film made it an instant classic. Tate had a regular role on the short-lived television series South Central (1994) as Andre. 

Tate acted in The Inkwell (1994) as Drew. One reviewer praised his performance and called Tate a "promising" actor. However, in negative reviews Tate was seen as "overacting" and compared unfavorably to Jim Carrey. In 1995, Tate portrayed Vietnam veteran Anthony Curtis in the Hughes brothers' Dead Presidents. A film reviewer stated Tate proved he could play sympathetic characters with his performance in the film. 

He took on the role of love-stricken young poet Darius in Love Jones (1997). Critic Jay Carr found Tate "engaging" in the role. Tate also played Kenny in The Fresh Prince of Bel-Air in the episode "That's No Lady, That's My Cousin", which was produced by Quincy Jones who Tate would later portray in the 2004 film Ray.

In 1997, Tate appeared as Ford Lincoln Mercury in The Postman. He played Frankie Lymon in the biopic Why Do Fools Fall in Love (1998). One critic praised Tate's dancing prowess in the film. He was the lead character, Neville, in 2000's Love Come Down. 

Throughout the 2000s, Tate continued his film career. Tate portrayed Vin Diesel's drug officer partner in A Man Apart (2003), with his other film work including Biker Boyz (2003), Crash (2004), and Waist Deep (2006). Tate was featured in R&B singer Ashanti's 2003 released music video Rain on Me, where he played the jealous, abusive spouse of Ashanti. The video touched on the subject of domestic abuse. In the video game 187 Ride or Die, Tate voices the main character, Buck.

Tate portrayed Shooter Cooper in Love Monkey, which was cancelled after three episodes. He starred in seasons 4-7 of FX's Rescue Me as Bart "Black Shawn" Johnston. Tate appeared as Malcolm, the brother of Don Cheadle's character, in House of Lies  and guest starred on an episode of The Mindy Project. Tate starred as beta tester Max in Beta Test (2016) and appeared in the 2017 film Girls Trip. Starting in 2017, Tate played Councilman Rashad Tate on  Power, and continued portraying the character in sequel series Power Book II: Ghost.

Filmography

Film

Television

Video games

References

External links 
Larenz Tate on Menace II Society and House of Lies, fastlifeshow.com, December 2012; accessed September 18, 2015.

1975 births
Living people
Male actors from Chicago
American male child actors
American male film actors
American male television actors
Outstanding Performance by a Cast in a Motion Picture Screen Actors Guild Award winners
20th-century American male actors
21st-century American male actors